Kaya Futbol Club, commonly referred to as Kaya Women's, is a Filipino women's football club affiliated with Kaya F.C.–Iloilo.

History
Kaya was the only Philippines Football League (PFL) club that fielded a women's team in the 2016–17 inaugural season of the PFF Women's League. However, they withdrew midseason.

In 2019, Kaya formed a women's team. The seven-a-side team competed in the inaugural season of the 7's Football League Women's Division, where they finished runners-up.

Kaya Women's completed their first eleven-a-side campaign, as well as their international debut, at the 2022 SingaCup's Women Football Championship in Singapore. They swept the tournament, beating the Lion City Sailors women's team, Phranakorn, and Persib Putri.

Crest and colors
Kaya Women's wear the same crest and colors as the men's team. The club's home color is yellow.

The club's colors: yellow, red, green and black, are based on the pan-African colors associated with Rastafari due to the influence of Reggae in the club's founding members' lives. The 31 stars on the crest are a tribute to Kaya Men's co-founder John-Rey "Lupoy" Bela-ong, who was killed in a robbery at age 31.

Players

 

Source: SingaCup Women Football Championship 2022

Personnel
As of October 2022 (SingaCup Women Football Championship 2022)

Honors
SingaCup
Champions: 1 (2022)

References

Women's football clubs in the Philippines
PFF Women's League clubs